Leo Andrew Comeso Ponce is a Filipino professional make-up artist. Hs is the former Mr. Fahrenheit 2016. He was crowned June 18, 2016 in a gay club in Quezon City. He bagged Best in Casual Wear.

Ponce competed for Mr. Gay World Philippines 2016 in UP Theater and landed him fifth place.

Early life 
He was born July 29, 1984, in Mandaluyong, and is a native of Nasugbu, Batangas.

References 

1984 births
Filipino make-up artists
Filipino gay artists
Living people
Filipino beauty pageant winners
People from Mandaluyong
People from Batangas